Rafael Nickel (born 30 July 1958) is a German fencer. He won a gold medal in the team épée event at the 1984 Summer Olympics.

References

External links
 

1958 births
Living people
German male fencers
Olympic fencers of West Germany
Fencers at the 1984 Summer Olympics
Olympic gold medalists for West Germany
Sportspeople from Hamburg
Olympic medalists in fencing
Medalists at the 1984 Summer Olympics